is a Japanese comedy manga series written and illustrated by Wakame Konbu. It has been serialized in Square Enix's shōnen manga magazine Monthly Gangan Joker since August 2017, and its chapters have been collected into nine tankōbon volumes. In North America, the manga is licensed 
by Square Enix. An anime television series adaptation by Silver Link aired from August to December 2021 on ABC and TV Asahi's ANiMAZiNG!!! programming block.

Plot
Jahy, the feared and respected number-two ruler of the Dark Realm, suddenly finds herself powerless and shrunken in the human world after a magical girl destroys a powerful mana crystal, which also destroys her home realm. The manga follows Jahy and her daily life as she learns to live in her new surroundings while she works to restore her original form, the mana crystal, and the Dark Realm.

Characters

Jahy is the former aide to the Dark Lord and second-in-command of the Dark Realm who is now living in the human world after the Dark Realm perished. She aims to find parts of the mana crystal and restore her home world and her original body, which is in a child-like state after the crystal was destroyed by a magical girl, leaving her powerless. Though she struggles to adapt to her new surroundings and her current state, she remains confident, vigorous, and ambitious. Later on in the series, she establishes her own restaurant but leaves Druj to run it.

A former subordinate of Jahy's who goes by the name  in the human world. She is the president of a consulting company. Even though she lives elegantly in a high-rise condominium while Jahy lives in squalor in a decaying apartment building, she nonetheless remains friendly with Jahy and regularly hangs out with her. She enjoys Jahy berating her and treating her like a subhuman.

Manager of the pub , where Jahy currently works. She is very friendly with Jahy and gives her the nickname 
 

Landlady of the apartment where Jahy lives and the sister of the pub manager. She constantly pesters Jahy about her rent and although she cares about her in some form, she has a very tsundere attitude. Like her sister, she gives Jahy a nickname by calling her 

An elementary school student who helps Jahy on her quest to find the mana crystals. She exudes an extreme amount of kindness and praise for Jahy; so much that Jahy was overwhelmed and had no choice but to end up befriending her.
  

The magical girl that destroyed Jahy's home world, who works in the same pub as her. She was originally an ordinary high school girl, but set out as a magical girl to save others from their misfortunes after a mysterious light bestowed a mission to her as she nearly drowned to death. As a result of collecting the same mana crystals as Jahy, she experiences regular bouts of incredibly bad luck. She eventually becomes friendly with Jahy and does not get along with Druj because of this.

A girl who aims to take Jahy's spot as the number-two ruler of the Dark Realm. Although she is extremely talented at inventing and planning strategies, she is careless and her strategies keep failing.

The Demon Lord of the Dark Realm who revived in a smaller form in Kyouko's house due to the mana crystals she had amassed. A non-talkative demon who has a blank expression on her face at most times, she is an incredible glutton, often eating large amounts of food.

The Demon Lord's younger sister, whose attempt to reconcile with her sister by turning Kyouko into a powerful magical girl accidentally resulted in destroying her and the Dark Realm. Thus, she went around as a mysterious light and began using magical girls to try and gather the mana crystals for her.

Media

Manga
Originally starting as a one-shot in March 2017, Square Enix has serialized The Great Jahy Will Not Be Defeated! in its monthly shōnen magazine, Gangan Joker, since August of the same year. As of October 21, 2022, nine tankōbon volumes have been published, starting with the first volume released on February 22, 2018. In North America, the manga is published by the Manga & Books division of Square Enix. The first volume was originally scheduled to release in September 2020, but had to be delayed due to the COVID-19 pandemic. The release date was changed to July 27, 2021.

Volume list

|}

Anime
An anime television series adaptation was announced on April 16, 2021. The two-cour series was animated by Silver Link and directed by Mirai Minato, with Michiko Yokote overseeing series scripts, Saori Nakashiki designing characters and serving as chief animation director, and Kōji Fujimoto and Osamu Sasaki composing the music. It aired from August 1 to December 19, 2021, on ABC and TV Asahi's  programming block. Crunchyroll licensed the series outside of Asia. Plus Media Networks Asia licensed the series in Southeast Asia and released it on Aniplus Asia.

On July 19, 2022, Crunchyroll announced that the series would receive an English dub, which premiered the following day.

Episode list

See also 
The Maid I Hired Recently Is Mysterious — Another manga series by the same author.

Notes

References

External links
 The Great Jahy Will Not Be Defeated! official manga website 
 The Great Jahy Will Not Be Defeated! official manga English website at Square Enix Manga & Books
 The Great Jahy Will Not Be Defeated! official anime website 
 

Anime series based on manga
Asahi Broadcasting Corporation original programming
Comedy anime and manga
Crunchyroll anime
Fiction about size change
Gangan Comics manga
Shōnen manga
Silver Link
Slice of life anime and manga
Supernatural anime and manga